Neftebaza is the name of several rural localities in Russia.

Modern localities
Neftebaza, Pankrushikhinsky District, Altai Krai, a settlement in Zheleznodorozhny Selsoviet of Pankrushikhinsky District in Altai Krai; 
Neftebaza, Smolensky District, Altai Krai, a settlement in Verkh-Obsky Selsoviet of Smolensky District in Altai Krai; 
Neftebaza, Altai Republic, a selo in Tenginskoye Rural Settlement of Ongudaysky District in the Altai Republic; 
Neftebaza, Republic of Karelia, a settlement in Pudozhsky District of the Republic of Karelia
Neftebaza, Kirov Oblast, a settlement in Grekhovsky Rural Okrug of Sovetsky District in Kirov Oblast; 
Neftebaza, Perm Krai, a settlement in Osinsky District of Perm Krai
Neftebaza, Nyurbinsky District, Sakha Republic, a selo in Oktyabrsky Rural Okrug of Nyurbinsky District in the Sakha Republic
Neftebaza, Olyokminsky District, Sakha Republic, a selo under the administrative jurisdiction of the Town of Olyokminsk in Olyokminsky District of the Sakha Republic
Neftebaza, Republic of Tatarstan, a settlement in Tukayevsky District of the Republic of Tatarstan
Neftebaza, Tomsk Oblast, a village in Molchanovsky District of Tomsk Oblast

Alternative names
Neftebaza, alternative name of Zarucheyny, a settlement in Mezheg Selo Administrative Territory of Ust-Vymsky District in the Komi Republic;